Sportscotland (officially styled sport), formerly the Scottish Sports Council, is the national agency for sport in Scotland.

The Scottish Sports Council was established in 1972 by royal charter. The body works in partnership with public, private and voluntary organisations. As an executive non-departmental public body of the Scottish Government, Sportscotland advises ministers and implements government policy for sport and physical recreation. In 2002/03 sportscotland invested approximately £48 million of government grants and lottery funds.

The organisation runs two national sport centres:
National Centre Inverclyde, near Largs, North Ayrshire, for the training of national squads, hosting championships and facilities for boccia, table tennis, badminton, squash etc.
National Centre Glenmore Lodge, in Glenmore Forest Park near Aviemore, facilities for skiing, rock climbing, mountaineering, hill walking, kayaking, canoeing etc.

In 1998 Sportscotland took over responsibility for the Scottish Institute of Sport and created the sportscotland institute of sport near the University of Stirling. Sportscotland invests in the majority of national sports governing bodies in Scotland, such as Scottish Athletics.

References

1972 establishments in Scotland
Organisations based in Scotland with royal patronage
Executive non-departmental public bodies of the Scottish Government
 
Scottish Government Learning and Justice Directorate
Government agencies established in 1972
Book publishing companies of Scotland
Organisations based in Glasgow
Physical education in the United Kingdom
Glasgow Green